Andrew Hutchinson may refer to:

 Andrew Hutchinson (ice hockey) (born 1980), American ice hockey defenseman
 Andrew Hutchinson (author) (born 1979), Australian writer
 Andrew Hutchinson (wrestler), British wrestler
 Andrew Hutchinson (cricketer) (born 1991), cricketer who plays for Guernsey
 Andy Hutchinson (born 1992), English footballer

See also
 Andrew Hutchison (born 1937), Primate of the Anglican Church of Canada
 Drew Hutchison (born 1990), American baseball pitcher
 Drew Hutchison (rugby league) (born 1995), Australian rugby league player